Phaya Khammao Vilay (1892 – 1965) was a Lao politician. He was born in Luang Prabang, and was educated in France, and eventually in 1917 joined the French colonial administrator in Laos. He was appointed as governor of Viang Chan from 1941 to 1945. He was one of the big contributors for funding Lao Issara in the cause of fighting for independent from France.

He headed the Lao Issara government formed in October 1945, serving under Phetsarath Ratanavongsa as Head of State, and followed the government into exile. Following the signing of Franco–Lao general convention in 1949, Khammao returned to French protectorate of Laos, and was appointed as minister of justice and health in 1950.

In 1955, he was appointed the President of the Royal Council.

References

1892 births
1965 deaths
Prime Ministers of Laos
People from Luang Prabang